Ercolani is an Italian-language surname. Notable people with the name include:

 Giorgio Ercolani (born 1926), Italian former sports shooter
 Lucian Ercolani (1888–1976), Italian furniture designer
 Milena Ercolani (born 1963), Sammarinese poet and novelist
 James William Ercolani, birth name of James Darren (born 1936), Italian-American actor

Italian-language surnames